Amblyseius laselvius is a species of mite in the family Phytoseiidae.

References

laselvius
Articles created by Qbugbot
Animals described in 1999